The Sheriff's Baby is a 1913 American silent Western film directed by D. W. Griffith.

Cast
 Alfred Paget as The Sheriff
 Henry B. Walthall as First Bandit
 Harry Carey as Second Bandit
 Lionel Barrymore as Third Bandit
 John T. Dillon as A Settler (as Jack Dillon)
 Kate Bruce as A Settler
 Robert Harron as The Deputy
 Dorothy Bernard
 Donald Crisp
 Charles Hill Mailes
 Joseph McDermott

See also
 Harry Carey filmography
 D. W. Griffith filmography
 Lionel Barrymore filmography

References

External links
 

1913 films
1913 Western (genre) films
1913 short films
American silent short films
American black-and-white films
Films directed by D. W. Griffith
Silent American Western (genre) films
1910s American films